Eliodoro Villazón Montaño (22 January 1848 – 12 September 1939) was a Bolivian lawyer and politician who served as the 27th president of Bolivia from 1909 to 1913 and as the 15th vice president of Bolivia from 1904 to 1909.

Early life
Villazón was born on January 22, 1848, in the town of Sacaba in the department of Cochabamba. He was the son of José Manuel Villazón and Manuela Montaño. He graduated as a lawyer from the University of San Francisco Xavier and one of the most distinguished lawmakers in the country.

At the age of twenty, during the de facto government of President Mariano Melgarejo (1864-1871), Villazón founded the newspaper El Ferroviario. Villazon married Enriqueta Torrico.

Political career 

He began his political career at a very young age, joining the Partido Rojo, a party founded by former president José María Linares. He was also a municipal councilor for the city of Cochabamba and Deputy for the department of Cochabamba on several occasions.

At the age of twenty-three, Villazón attended the National Assembly of 1871 which had been called by the government of newly installed President Agustín Morales after the overthrow of Melgarejo. Furthermore, he attended the Conventions of 1880 and 1889 as a delegate. He was Minister of Finance and Industry during the government of President Narciso Campero, in which he also represented Bolivia as its financial agent in Europe. Specialized in finance, Villazón made a considerable fortune by managing the fortunes of several magnates of his time, including that of Francisco Argandoña and Gregorio Pacheco.

Because of his affluence and political power, he was one of the main founders of the Liberal Party of Bolivia and supported his party during the Bolivian Civil War of 1898-1899. He was Minister of Foreign Relations during the government of liberal President José Manuel Pando, and he devoted himself to resolving border conflicts with Bolivia's neighboring countries.

During the presidency of Ismael Montes, Villazón became Vice President of Bolivia at the age of 56, serving from 1904 to 1909. He also worked as a defense attorney in the Bolivian-Peruvian border dispute over the Manuripi.

President of Bolivia 

Villazón ran as the Liberal Party's candidate for the presidency during the 1909 general elections. He triumphed by a wide margin that year, succeeding Ismael Montes as president. He was installed as president of Bolivia at sixty-one years of age, on August 12, 1909, along with his 2 vice presidents: Macario Pinilla Vargas (first vice-presidency) and Juan Misael Saracho (second vice-presidency).

His government was one of the most prosperous in the republican history of Bolivia, since it enjoyed a budget surplus and a context of tranquility, despite the mining crisis of 1908. He created the Higher Institute of Commerce of La Paz, hoping to further the economic stability the country was enjoying. He also founded the Oruro School of Mines, today the National Faculty of Engineering, and built railway from Cochabamba to Arani, inaugurated in 1913.

Villazón signed a Border Rectification Treaty with Peru, known as the Polo-Sánchez Bustamante Treaty. It was signed in the city of La Paz on September 17, 1909, by the Minister Plenipotentiary of Peru, Solón Polo, and the Minister of Foreign Affairs of Bolivia, Daniel Sánchez Bustamante. This treaty put an end to the Peruvian-Bolivian border dispute, and prevented an alliance between Bolivia and Chile against Peru. It also fixed some pending boundary issues with Argentina.

At the end of his term, he handed over the command of his party to his eventual successor, Ismael Montes, who won the general elections of  1913 and was inaugurated as president on August 14. Villazón then traveled to Buenos Aires to work as Plenipotentiary Ambassador of Bolivia in Argentina.

Later life and death 
Twenty-six years after having left the presidency, Eliodoro Villazón died on September 12, 1939, in the city of Cochabamba at the age of ninety-one. It is also worth mentioning that Villazón became one of the four oldest presidents of Bolivia, along with Hugo Ballivián, Víctor Paz Estenssoro and Lidia Gueiler.

References 

 Mesa José de; Gisbert, Teresa; and Carlos D. Mesa, "Historia De Bolivia", 3rd edition. pp. 505–509.

1848 births
1939 deaths
20th-century Bolivian politicians
Ambassadors of Bolivia to Argentina
Bolivian diplomats
Bolivian journalists
19th-century Bolivian lawyers
Bolivian people of Spanish descent
Candidates in the 1909 Bolivian presidential election
Foreign ministers of Bolivia
Government ministers of Bolivia
Liberal Party (Bolivia) politicians
Members of the Chamber of Deputies (Bolivia)
Members of the Senate of Bolivia
Finance ministers of Bolivia
Interior ministers of Bolivia
People from Chapare Province
Presidents of Bolivia
Presidents of the Senate of Bolivia
Vice presidents of Bolivia